Ćirković is a Serbian surname. It may refer to:

 Sima Ćirković (1929–2009), Serbian historian and member of the Serbian Academy of Science and Arts . ...
 Milivoje Ćirković (born 1977), retired Serbian footballer
 Lazar Ćirković (born 1992), Serbian football defender
 Dragoslav Ćirković (born 1954), Serbian politician
 Miodrag Ćirković (born 1965), retired Serbian footballer
 Boško Ćirković, known as Škabo (born 1976), Serbian rapper

Serbian surnames